Klaus Wischniewski (born 8 December 1954) is a retired German football midfielder.

References

External links
 

1954 births
Living people
German footballers
Bundesliga players
VfL Bochum players
Place of birth missing (living people)
DSC Wanne-Eickel players
Association football midfielders